Naples is a city in Morris County, Texas, United States. The population was 1,378 at the 2010 census.

Geography

Naples is located at  (33.202983, –94.679006).

The total area is 99.16% land.

The climate in this area is characterized by hot, humid summers and generally mild to cool winters.  According to the Köppen Climate Classification system, Naples has a humid subtropical climate, abbreviated "Cfa" on climate maps.

Demographics

As of the 2020 United States census, there were 1,387 people, 530 households, and 321 families residing in the city.

Local cultural events
The City of Naples hosts the annual Watermelon Festival on the last weekend of July.

Education
The City of Naples is served by Pewitt Consolidated Independent School District.

References

Cities in Texas
Cities in Morris County, Texas